Paradiaptomus excellens is a species of copepod in the family Diaptomidae. It is endemic to South Africa.

References

Diaptomidae
Endemic crustaceans of South Africa
Crustaceans described in 1929
Freshwater crustaceans of Africa
Taxonomy articles created by Polbot
Taxobox binomials not recognized by IUCN